Chaukalshi is an ethnic community of Maharashtra and Goa.

They are related to Panchkalshi community and are involved in occupation of Mali, carpenter and herdsman. They are one of the original tribes, who migrated to Bombay in 13th century AD with Yaduvanshi king, Raja Bhimdev. Community is widespread mostly across konkan region from Palghar district to Ratnagiri district in Maharashtra.

Post independence of India, there were some efforts for unification of Chaukalshi & Panchkalshi tribes and a foundation named Kshatriya Parishad was founded in 1949 for the purpose.

References

Indian castes
History of Mumbai
Social groups of Maharashtra
Social groups of Goa
Other Backward Classes